St. Louis Community College–Wildwood (also known as STLCC-Wildwood, or Wildwood for short) is the newest campus in the STLCC system. The campus is located in Wildwood, Missouri, a western suburb of St. Louis, Missouri in an area known as west St. Louis County.

History
The college opened in August 2007. The Wildwood campus was created because of the rapidly growing population of west St. Louis County and to relieve some of the pressures from STLCC-Meramec's growing and overcapacity 12,000-13,000 student population.

Campus
The Wildwood campus is located off Route 109 and Route 100 in West St. Louis County. Wildwood is state-of-the-art; it the first Green campus in Missouri built with environmentally friendly materials. The architecture of the building is also designed to enhance the health of the students and faculty using the facilities. STLCC-WW is also tobacco-free, not only in the buildings but on all campus property. The main campus  building houses high-tech classrooms and labs, a library and bookstore, student services, lounges, a multipurpose room and rooms equipped with sophisticated presentation and Web-based technologies.

Notable Programs
Wildwood currently offers associate degrees in three areas of study: General Transfer Studies, 
Business Administration, and Teaching.

UM-St. Louis at Wildwood
Beginning in the Spring 2008 semester UM-St Louis began offering classes at Wildwood for students to begin taking classes at Wildwood and then make an easy transfer after the second year into the main UMSL campus.

Athletics
STLCC operates as a single entity in athletic competition; Wildwood students are permitted to participate if eligible.

The Wildwood campus does not serve as the "home field" for any STLCC athletic program, and in the past did not participate in athletics.

See also
St. Louis Community College

References

External links
St. Louis Community College STLCC-Meramec

Wildwood
Two-year colleges in the United States
Universities and colleges in St. Louis County, Missouri
Educational institutions established in 2007
2007 establishments in Missouri